Black Eyes is an unincorporated community in Bennett County, South Dakota, United States.

References

Unincorporated communities in Bennett County, South Dakota
Unincorporated communities in South Dakota